The 1948 United States House of Representatives elections in South Carolina were held on November 2, 1948 to select six Representatives for two-year terms from the state of South Carolina.  Four incumbents were re-elected, but John J. Riley of the 2nd congressional district was defeated in the Democratic primary by Hugo S. Sims, Jr.  The seat remained with the Democrats along with the open seat in the 3rd congressional district and the composition of the state delegation remained solely Democratic.

1st congressional district
Incumbent Democratic Congressman L. Mendel Rivers of the 1st congressional district, in office since 1941, defeated Republican challenger W.T. Baggott.

General election results

|-
| 
| colspan=5 |Democratic hold
|-

2nd congressional district
Incumbent Democratic Congressman John J. Riley of the 2nd congressional district, in office since 1945, was defeated in the Democratic primary by Hugo S. Sims, Jr. who also defeated Republican W. Edward Moore in the general election.

Democratic primary

General election results

|-
| 
| colspan=5 |Democratic hold
|-

3rd congressional district
Incumbent Democratic Congressman W.J. Bryan Dorn of the 3rd congressional district, in office since 1947, chose to not seek re-election and instead made an unsuccessful run for Senator.  James Butler Hare won the Democratic primary and defeated Republican D.F. Merill in the general election.

Democratic primary

General election results

|-
| 
| colspan=5 |Democratic hold
|-

4th congressional district
Incumbent Democratic Congressman Joseph R. Bryson of the 4th congressional district, in office since 1939, defeated Republican challenger James B. Gaston.

General election results

|-
| 
| colspan=5 |Democratic hold
|-

5th congressional district
Incumbent Democratic Congressman James P. Richards of the 5th congressional district, in office since 1933, defeated Roy C. Cobb in the Democratic primary and Republican J.D. Hambright in the general election.

Democratic primary

General election results

|-
| 
| colspan=5 |Democratic hold
|-

6th congressional district
Incumbent Democratic Congressman John L. McMillan of the 6th congressional district, in office since 1939, defeated Republican challenger F.L. Bradfield.

General election results

|-
| 
| colspan=5 |Democratic hold
|-

See also
United States House of Representatives elections, 1948
United States Senate election in South Carolina, 1948
South Carolina's congressional districts

References

"Supplemental Report of the Secretary of State to the General Assembly of South Carolina." Reports and Resolutions of South Carolina to the General Assembly of the State of South Carolina. Volume I. Columbia, SC: 1949, pp. 12–14.

South Carolina
United States House Of Representatives
1948